Valentín Paraíso (born 13 March 1955) is a Spanish fencer. He competed in the individual sabre event at the 1980 Summer Olympics.

References

External links
 

1955 births
Living people
Spanish male sabre fencers
Olympic fencers of Spain
Fencers at the 1980 Summer Olympics